Sam Cho (born April 24, 1990) is an American politician and entrepreneur based in Seattle, Washington serving as a commissioner of the Port of Seattle. Prior to serving as a commissioner, he was Founder and CEO of Seven Seas Export, a political appointee in the Obama Administration, and a staffer for a member of the Washington State Senate and United States Congress. Cho was elected to the Seattle Port Commission in 2019, becoming the only minority port commissioner at that time. He took his oath of office in two languages, English and Korean as a tribute to his family’s immigrant roots. In 2021, Cho was listed by Seattle Met as one of the 100 most influential people in Seattle.

Early life and education 
Cho was born in Chicago, Illinois but raised in Seattle, Washington by his immigrant parents who came to the United States in the late 1980s through the Port of Seattle from South Korea.

Cho holds a B.A. from American University, where he was member of the Pi Kappa Phi fraternity. and a Masters of Science degree from The London School of Economics.

Early career 
Cho was a congressional staffer in the U.S. House of Representatives for Congressman Ami Bera from California's 7th congressional district. He was also a Special Assistant in the General Services Administration.

After the Obama Administration ended, he returned to his home state of Washington to start a business in international exports and work in the Washington State Legislature for Senator Bob Hasegawa.

In 2018, Cho was appointed by Governor Jay Inslee to serve as a Commissioner on the Washington State Commission on Asian Pacific American Affairs (CAPAA).

Business career

Seven Seas Export 
In the winter of 2016, there was an opportunity to exploit the price differential of eggs in the midst of Asia's worst avian influenza (bird flu) pandemic. The bird flu wiped out chicken flocks across the region which resulted in an egg shortage. The price of eggs nearly tripled in countries like South Korea. In response, the South Korean government temporarily reduced import tariffs to 0% and subsidized freight cost to encourage egg imports to buttress the egg shortage crisis.

In February of 2017, Cho founded and served as the CEO of Seven Seas Export, a trading company that took advantage of the crisis. In 2 years, Cho exported over 2.5 million pounds of American egg products to Asia.

In September of 2019, Cho was a recipient of the 425 Business 30 Under 30 award.

Political career

Port of Seattle Commission 
In May 2019, Cho announced his campaign to run and replace Courtney Gregoire on the Seattle Port Commission.

Cho's priorities included the economy, environmental sustainability, accountability, transparency, and fighting human trafficking.

Despite a primary race with six other candidates including a former mayor, Cho came first place with 31.1% of the vote to move onto the general election.

In the general election, his opponent was former City of Bellevue Mayor Grant Degginger. Cho defeated the former mayor with 60.8% of the vote, becoming the first Korean American and youngest port commissioner since the founding of the port in 1911. He was sworn in on January 7, 2020.

Cho was also endorsed by former Governor of Washington and former U.S. Secretary of Commerce Gary Locke. In 2020, Cho was named to New America's list of Next-Generation Asian American Foreign Policy and National Security leaders.

References

External links 
 Port of Seattle page

Living people
1990 births
American politicians of Korean descent
Asian-American people in Washington (state) politics
American people of Korean descent
American businesspeople
Politicians from Seattle
21st-century American politicians
American University alumni
Alumni of the London School of Economics